Paolo Grillo (born 8 February 1997) is an Italian football player. He plays for  club Messina.

Club career
He was raised in the youth teams of Palermo, but did not appear for the senior squad. He spent the first 4 seasons of his senior career in Serie C.

On 21 August 2020, he joined Serie B club Cittadella. He made his Serie B debut for Cittadella on 31 October 2020 in a game against Monza. He substituted Christian D'Urso in the 90th minute. On 1 February 2021, he was loaned to Serie C club Catanzaro.

On 22 July 2021, he signed with Vibonese.

On 26 July 2022, Grillo moved to Messina on a one-year contract with an option to extend.

References

External links
 

1997 births
People from Partinico
Sportspeople from the Province of Palermo
Footballers from Sicily
Sicily international footballers
Living people
Italian footballers
Association football forwards
A.C.N. Siena 1904 players
Siracusa Calcio players
F.C. Pro Vercelli 1892 players
A.S.D. Sicula Leonzio players
A.S. Cittadella players
U.S. Catanzaro 1929 players
U.S. Vibonese Calcio players
A.C.R. Messina players
Serie B players
Serie C players